Li Xin is the name of:
 Li Xin (Qin) ( 220s BC), military general of the Qin state during the Warring States period
 Li Xin (Western Liang) (died 420), ruler of Western Liang of the Sixteen Kingdoms
 Li Xin (journalist) (born 1979), Chinese journalist

Sportspeople
 Li Xin (basketball) (born 1969), Chinese basketball player and coach
 Li Xin (footballer, born 1989), Chinese association footballer
 Li Xin (footballer, born 1991), Chinese association footballer
 Li Xin (baseball) (born 1992), Chinese baseball player
 Li Xin (skier) (born 1992), Chinese cross country skier

See also
 Lee Hsin (1953–2017), Taiwanese politician, whose name can also be romanized as "Li Xin"
Lixin County, a county in Anhui, China